Kochkor is a district of Naryn Region in northern-central Kyrgyzstan. The administrative seat lies at Kochkor.

Population

Populated places
In total, Kochkor District includes 35 settlements in 11 rural communities. Each rural community comprises one or several villages. The rural communities and settlements in the Kochkor District are as follows:

 Ak-Kyya (seat: Kara-Suu; incl. Jangy-Jol)
 Cholpon (seat: Cholpon; incl. Ara-Köl, Osoviakhim, Tuz, Epkin, Ak-Chiy, Oro-Bashy, Tarmal-Saz and Uzun-Bulak)
 Kara-Suu (seat: Mantysh; incl. Ak-Talaa, Kara-Moynok, Kyzyl-Döbö and Ortok)
 Kochkor (seat: Kochkor; incl. Bolshevik and Tengdik)
 Kök-Jar (seat: Kök-Jar)
 Kosh-Döbö (seat: Kara-Saz; incl. Kara-Künggöy)
 Kum-Döbö (seat: Kum-Döbö; incl. Ak-Jar, Buguchu and Shamshy)
 Sary-Bulak (seat: Ak-Kyya; incl. Sary-Bulak)
 Semiz-Bel (seat: Kara-Too; incl. Arsy, Semiz-Bel and Chekildek)
 Song-Kul (seat: Tölök)
 Talaa-Bulak (seat: Döng-Alysh; incl. Komsomol)

References 

Districts of Naryn Region